Pennsylvania Route 981 (PA 981) is a state highway which runs  across Westmoreland County, in southwestern Pennsylvania, United States. The highway begins at PA 51 in Rostraver Township, Pennsylvania, and runs northward across Westmoreland County, passing through the towns of Mount Pleasant, Latrobe, and New Alexandria before ending at PA 819 in Salina.

Route description

PA 981 begins at PA 51 in Rostraver Township. From Rostraver, the route runs eastward to the borough of Mount Pleasant, where it meets PA 31. PA 981 then turns northward, meeting US 30 outside the city of Latrobe, near the Arnold Palmer Regional Airport. The route then continues northward through Latrobe, passing by Saint Vincent College in Latrobe. Continuing northward, PA 981 meets US 119 and US 22 at the borough of New Alexandria. The route then ends at PA 819 near Salina.

History
PA 981 previously ended at PA 156, but was extended in 1998 to its current terminus at PA 819.

PennDOT began construction in 2006 to improve the intersection between PA 981 and US 30 near Latrobe.

In 2021, A petition to rename a section of Pennsylvania Route 981 as Honorable Mike Reese Memorial Highway from Kecksburg Road in Mount Pleasant Township Pennsylvania, to Pennsylvania Route 819 in Mount Pleasant Township was approved by the state legislature and became official on August 11, 2021, in a special ceremony dedicated to honor the late Pennsylvania State Representative Mike Reese.

Major intersections

See also

References

External links

Pennsylvania Highways: PA 981

981
Transportation in Westmoreland County, Pennsylvania